James Philip Dunn (January 10, 1884, New York July 24, 1936, Jersey City, New Jersey) was an American composer and organist in New York, Jersey City and Bayonne, New Jersey. At Columbia University he was a pupil of Cornelius Rybner and Edward MacDowell.

Work List
 Chanson Passionée: Romance, 1916
 Surrexit Christus Hodie
 Cortège Orientale, 1921
 Overture on Negro Themes, 1921
 We, 1928

References

1884 births
1936 deaths
American male composers
American composers
American male organists
Musicians from New York City
Musicians from New Jersey
20th-century organists
20th-century American male musicians
American organists